Timothy Michael Watson (born 13 July 1961) is a former Australian rules footballer who played for the Essendon Football Club in the Australian Football League (AFL). After retiring from the game, he has continued working in the Australian football industry as a coach, sports journalist and media personality.

Watson was the fourth-youngest player ever to play in the VFL/AFL competition and made a comeback after retirement which included another premiership.

Tim is a prominent and popular sports journalist and media personality. On television he regularly appears on the Seven Network, where he presents the sport on the network's 6:00 pm Melbourne news bulletin and has a special comments role on the station's Australian Football League (AFL) football coverage.

Football career

Early career
Watson made his VFL debut in 1977 for Essendon at the age of fifteen years and 305 days, the fourth-youngest player in the history of the League.

Watson won the Essendon best-and-fairest award four times (1980, 1985, 1988 and 1989). In 1989, he won the AFL Players Association MVP award, now known as the Leigh Matthews Trophy.

Watson played the ruck-rover in Essendon's 1984 and 1985 grand final victories.  He was made captain in 1989 and held that position until 1991, before retiring from the game due to the injury problems that had plagued the later part of his career. In the 1992 pre-season draft, Watson was recruited by the West Coast Eagles even though he had signalled his intention to retire. He never played a game for the club, instead continuing a commentary role with the Seven Network for 1992, which included working as a boundary rider in that year's grand final which the Eagles won.

Comeback
Early in the 1993 season Essendon coach Kevin Sheedy lured Watson out of retirement.  Although Watson was not as fit as he had once been, and was never able to recapture his top form, he played a vital role in the forward line, kicking some important goals throughout the year.  His experience in what was a very young team was instrumental in helping Essendon win an unexpected premiership that year.

After the 1994 season, Watson retired for good, having played 307 games and kicked 335 goals.  Since his retirement, Watson was named the sixth greatest player to ever play for Essendon in the "Champions of Essendon" list, and was named ruck-rover in their "Team of the Century".

Coaching career

St Kilda Football Club senior coach (1999–2000)
Watson became senior coach of the St Kilda Football Club, when he replaced Stan Alves, after Alves was sacked at the end of the 1998 season.  Watson was then the senior coach of the St Kilda Football Club in the 1999 season and the 2000 season. His success was limited, with the side winning only 12 of the 44 matches they played while he was in charge with one draw and losing thirty-one games in total, bringing a winning percentage to 27 percent. In the 1999 season, St Kilda finished tenth on the ladder with ten wins and twelve losses. In the 2000 season, St Kilda won only two games for the entire season with one draw and nineteen losses, where they finished sixteenth (last on the ladder) for the wooden spoon and Watson resigned during the middle of the 2000 season, where he would step down at seasons end, forgoing the final year of his three-year contract. Watson was then replaced by Malcolm Blight as St Kilda Football Club senior coach.

Statistics

Playing statistics

|-
|- style="background-color: #EAEAEA"
! scope="row" style="text-align:center" | 1977
|style="text-align:center;"|
| 32 || 16 || 16 || 10 || 136 || 69 || 205 || 36 ||  || 1.0 || 0.7 || 8.5 || 4.3 || 12.8 || 2.3 || 
|-
! scope="row" style="text-align:center" | 1978
|style="text-align:center;"|
| 32 || 19 || 11 || 8 || 162 || 94 || 256 || 40 ||  || 0.6 || 0.4 || 8.5 || 4.9 || 13.5 || 2.1 || 
|- style="background-color: #EAEAEA"
! scope="row" style="text-align:center" | 1979
|style="text-align:center;"|
| 32 || 23 || 34 || 27 || 223 || 111 || 334 || 82 ||  || 1.5 || 1.2 || 9.7 || 4.8 || 14.5 || 3.6 || 
|-
! scope="row" style="text-align:center" | 1980
|style="text-align:center;"|
| 32 || 22 || 42 || 25 || 337 || 199 || 536 || 94 ||  || 1.9 || 1.1 || 15.3 || 9.0 || 24.4 || 4.3 || 
|- style="background-color: #EAEAEA"
! scope="row" style="text-align:center" | 1981
|style="text-align:center;"|
| 32 || 17 || 15 || 21 || 246 || 111 || 357 || 52 ||  || 0.9 || 1.2 || 14.5 || 6.5 || 21.0 || 3.1 || 
|-
! scope="row" style="text-align:center" | 1982
|style="text-align:center;"|
| 32 || 22 || 24 || 31 || 384 || 153 || 537 || 85 ||  || 1.1 || 1.4 || 17.5 || 7.0 || 24.4 || 3.9 || 
|- style="background-color: #EAEAEA"
! scope="row" style="text-align:center" | 1983
|style="text-align:center;"|
| 32 || 26 || 27 || 20 || 442 || 171 || 613 || 115 ||  || 1.0 || 0.8 || 17.0 || 6.6 || 23.6 || 4.4 || 
|-
|style="text-align:center;background:#afe6ba;"|1984†
|style="text-align:center;"|
| 32 || 22 || 25 || 22 || 327 || 142 || 469 || 118 ||  || 1.1 || 1.0 || 14.9 || 6.5 || 21.3 || 5.4 || 
|- style="background-color: #EAEAEA"
|style="text-align:center;background:#afe6ba;"|1985†
|style="text-align:center;"|
| 32 || 24 || 27 || 25 || 352 || 183 || 535 || 99 ||  || 1.1 || 1.0 || 14.7 || 7.6 || 22.3 || 4.1 || 
|-
! scope="row" style="text-align:center" | 1986
|style="text-align:center;"|
| 32 || 3 || 0 || 2 || 40 || 26 || 66 || 6 ||  || 0.0 || 0.7 || 13.3 || 8.7 || 22.0 || 2.0 || 
|- style="background-color: #EAEAEA"
! scope="row" style="text-align:center" | 1987
|style="text-align:center;"|
| 32 || 7 || 5 || 8 || 84 || 29 || 113 || 18 || 13 || 0.7 || 1.1 || 12.0 || 4.1 || 16.1 || 2.6 || 1.9
|-
! scope="row" style="text-align:center" | 1988
|style="text-align:center;"|
| 32 || 19 || 24 || 17 || 300 || 136 || 436 || 92 || 22 || 1.3 || 0.9 || 15.8 || 7.2 || 22.9 || 4.8 || 1.2
|- style="background-color: #EAEAEA"
! scope="row" style="text-align:center" | 1989
|style="text-align:center;"|
| 32 || 24 || 23 || 15 || 334 || 205 || 539 || 99 || 39 || 1.0 || 0.6 || 13.9 || 8.5 || 22.5 || 4.1 || 1.6
|-
! scope="row" style="text-align:center" | 1990
|style="text-align:center;"|
| 32 || 21 || 19 || 21 || 262 || 156 || 418 || 93 || 26 || 0.9 || 1.0 || 12.5 || 7.4 || 19.9 || 4.4 || 1.2
|- style="background-color: #EAEAEA"
! scope="row" style="text-align:center" | 1991
|style="text-align:center;"|
| 32 || 17 || 15 || 13 || 192 || 139 || 331 || 65 || 13 || 0.9 || 0.8 || 11.3 || 8.2 || 19.5 || 3.8 || 0.8
|-
! scope="row" style="text-align:center" | 1992
|style="text-align:center;"|
| 33 || 0 || — || — || — || — || — || — || — || — || — || — || — || — || — || —
|- style="background-color: #EAEAEA"
|style="text-align:center;background:#afe6ba;"|1993†
|style="text-align:center;"|
| 32 || 16 || 26 || 11 || 154 || 101 || 255 || 58 || 26 || 1.6 || 0.7 || 9.6 || 6.3 || 15.9 || 3.6 || 1.6
|-
! scope="row" style="text-align:center" | 1994
|style="text-align:center;"|
| 32 || 9 || 2 || 0 || 65 || 35 || 100 || 24 || 12 || 0.2 || 0.0 || 7.2 || 3.9 || 11.1 || 2.7 || 1.3
|- class="sortbottom"
! colspan=3| Career
! 307
! 335
! 276
! 4040
! 2060
! 6100
! 1176
! 151
! 1.1
! 0.9
! 13.2
! 6.7
! 19.9
! 3.8
! 1.3
|}

Coaching statistics

|- style="background-color: #EAEAEA"
! scope="row" style="text-align:center; font-weight:normal" | 1999
|style="text-align:center;"|
| 22 || 10 || 12 || 0 || 45.5% || 10 || 16
|-
! scope="row" style="text-align:center; font-weight:normal" | 2000
|style="text-align:center;"|
| 22 || 2 || 19 || 1 || 11.4% || 16 || 16
|- class="sortbottom"
! colspan=2| Career totals
! 44
! 12
! 31
! 1
! 28.4%
! colspan=2|
|}

Media career
Like many past players, Watson has become a media personality, serving as a sports presenter on Seven News in Melbourne as well as having a special comments role on Seven's AFL coverage.

He has also appeared on many football-related TV shows, as a sports columnist in The Age newspaper, and from 2004 until 2013, a co-host on the Morning Glory show with Andrew Maher, on Melbourne radio station 1116 SEN.

In November 2013, Watson resigned from 1116 SEN to spend more time at the Seven Network, it was later announced that he would replace Sandy Roberts as weeknight sport presenter on Seven News in Melbourne. In 2015, Watson returned to the breakfast shift at 1116 SEN.

Personal life
During the late 1970s, Watson's older brother Larry also played at Essendon as well as  before moving to Adelaide to play with West Adelaide in 1981, going on to win the SANFL premiership with Wests in 1983.

In 1993 Tim was named 'Victorian Father of the Year'. In the 2002 National Draft, his son, Jobe Watson, was drafted by Essendon under the father-son rule.  Tim and Jobe were both coached by Kevin Sheedy.
Tim also has a younger brother Rick who currently lives in Tocumwal in New South Wales.

Tim is married to Susie Watson, with son Jobe and daughters Billie, Tess and Grace.

References

External links

 Tim Watson – Champions of Essendon
 Tim Watson – SEN profile
 Tim Watson – Saxton Speakers Bureau
 Tim Watson – 7news profile

St Kilda Football Club coaches
1961 births
Essendon Football Club players
Essendon Football Club Premiership players
Leigh Matthews Trophy winners
Champions of Essendon
Australian rules footballers from Victoria (Australia)
Seven News presenters
Australian Football Hall of Fame inductees
Victorian State of Origin players
Crichton Medal winners
Dimboola Football Club players
Living people
Three-time VFL/AFL Premiership players